In United Andhra Pradesh, the general elections and state assembly elections were held simultaneously. In both, the ruling Telugu Desam Party-Bharatiya Janata Party (TDP-BJP) combine was routed. BJP could not win a single seat. The result was a landslide victory for the United Progressive Alliance which won 34 out of 42 seats, which reflects the state elections that occurred before the general elections, where National Democratic Alliance (NDA) member, TDP, was defeated soundly by Y.S. Rajasekhara Reddy and the Indian National Congress. Alliance with CPM and CPI helped the Congress party. Congress had contested in alliance with the communist parties and the TRS.

Results by party

Parliament Constituencies

Telangana Region

Andhra Region

Results by constituency

 
 
 

 Note: Telugu Desam Party was not part of the National Democratic Alliance (India) in the 1999 elections, instead it gave outside support to the NDA.

 
 
 

 
 
 

 
 
 

 
 
 

 
 
 

 Note: Telugu Desam Party was not part of the National Democratic Alliance (India) in the 1999 elections, instead it gave outside support to the NDA.

 
 
 

 
 
 

 
 
 

 
 
 

 
 
 

 
 
 

 
 
 

 
 
 

 
 
 

 
 
 

 
 
 

 
 
 

 
 
 

 
 
 

 
 
 

 Note: Telugu Desam Party was not part of the National Democratic Alliance (India) in the 1999 elections, instead it gave outside support to the NDA.

 
 
 

 
 
 

 
 
 

 
 
 

 
 
 

 
 
 

 
 
 

 Note: Telugu Desam Party was not part of the National Democratic Alliance (India) in the 1999 elections, instead it gave outside support to the NDA.

References

Indian general elections in Andhra Pradesh
2000s in Andhra Pradesh
Andhra Pradesh